Zhou Huachen (born June 1952) is a former Chinese politician who spent most of his career in northeast China's Jilin province. He was investigated by China's top anti-graft agency in June 2018. Previously he served as vice chairman of the Standing Committee of Jilin People's Congress. He was a delegate to the 17th National Congress of the Chinese Communist Party.

Biography
Zhou was born in Qian'an County, Hebei, in June 1952. During the Cultural Revolution, he was a sent-down youth in his home-county and then was transferred to Dunhua, a county-level city of the Yanbian Korean Autonomous Prefecture in Jilin. In February 1973, he became a teacher at Xinxiang Primary School and later became a township leader in 1980. In January 1986, he was appointed deputy director of Dunhua Industrial Bureau, and became director of Dunhua Township Enterprise Bureau in August of that same year. He became assistant mayor of Dunhua in May 1987, and was made vice mayor in February 1990. He became mayor in December 1995, and then party secretary, the top political position in the city, beginning in August 1997. In February 1999, he was vice mayor of Yanbian Korean Autonomous Prefecture, and held that office until March 2001, when he was appointed deputy secretary-general of Jilin Provincial People's Government and deputy director of its General Office. He served as mayor of Baishan from January 2004 to July 2006, and party secretary, the top political position in the city, from July 2006 to January 2008. In January 2008, he was appointed party secretary of Jilin City, concurrently serving as vice chairman of the Standing Committee of Jilin People's Congress since February 2011.

Downfall
On 12 June 2018, he was put under investigation for alleged "serious violations of discipline and laws" by the Central Commission for Discipline Inspection (CCDI), the party's internal disciplinary body, and the National Supervisory Commission, the highest anti-corruption agency of China. His predecessor Xu Jianyi was sacked for graft in March 2015.

References

1952 births
Living people
People from Qian'an, Hebei
People's Republic of China politicians from Hebei
Chinese Communist Party politicians from Hebei